Johann Wolfgang "Hans" Gmoser, CM (July 7, 1932 – July 5, 2006) was a founder of modern mountaineering in Canada.  Born in Austria in 1932, he came to Canada in 1951, and since then has been a major driving force behind the growing popularity of climbing, skiing and guiding.

In the 1950s he pioneered new rock climbs, most notably Grillmair Chimneys (1952), Calgary Route (1953) - with Franz Dopf leading, and Diretissima (1957) on Yamnuska.  He made the third (and first Canadian) ascents of both Mount Alberta (1958) and Brussels Peak (1960).  He participated in what may have been the first ascent of Alaska's Mount Blackburn in 1958, and led very successful expeditions to Mount Logan (east ridge) in 1959, and to Mount McKinley (Wickersham Wall) in 1963.  In 1961 he climbed a difficult new route on the south face of Mount Louis.  He was described as "a good leader.  He always had plans and he did his darndest to make his dreams come true."

Gmoser was a very capable and ambitious mountain guide.  For years he travelled throughout North America, presenting his films and devoting vast amounts of energy toward promoting the Canadian mountain experience.  In 1963 he was a founding member of the Association of Canadian Mountain Guides (ACMG) and was its first technical chairman.  In 1957 he founded Rocky Mountain Guides which eventually grew to become  Canadian Mountain Holidays (CMH), advertised as the largest mountain adventure operation in the world.  CMH is where Gmoser made his mark in heliskiing.

Gmoser was elected an honorary member of The Alpine Club of Canada (1986), was awarded the Order of Canada (1987) and Golden Jubilee Medal (2002), received the Banff Mountain Film Festival Summit of Excellence award (1989), was elected to the Honour Roll of Canadian Skiing (1989), was named an honorary member of the International Federation of Mountain Guides Association (1992), in 1997 was elected Honorary President of the ACMG, presented a Lifetime Achievement Award from the North American Snowsports Journalists Association in 1998, and in 2002 was inducted to the US National Ski Hall of Fame.

References

 Gmoser, Hans (1986) Operations Guidelines Association of British Columbia Heli-Ski Operators 
 Gmoser, Hans (1996) The CMH gallery: a visual celebration of CMH Heli-Skiing and Heli-Hiking Altitude Publishing, Ltd. 
 Patillo, Roger W. (2005) The Canadian Rockies: Pioneers, Legends and True Tales  , Page 379
 Scott, Chic (2005) Powder Pioneers: Ski Stories from the Canadian Rockies  , Page 121
 Fry, John (2006) "Up By Air! The Adventure-Filled Golden Years of Heli-Skiing" Skiing Heritage Journal Vol. 18, No. 3: 8-13
 Donahue, Topher (2008) Bugaboo Dreams: A Story of Skiers, Helicopters and Mountains 
 Scott, Chic (2009) Deep powder and steep rock: the life of mountain guide Hans Gmoser Assiniboine Pub.,

External links
 Ski Press World "Heli-Pioneer Gmoser Dies After Cycling Accident" July 6, 2006
 50 Years of CMH Heli-Skiing at canadianmountainholidays.com

1932 births
2006 deaths
Canadian mountain climbers
Members of the Order of Canada